This is a list of the 102 communes of Luxembourg, a basic administrative division in Luxembourg, of which each canton is required to contain at least one.

List of municipalities 
The number, location, and size of municipalities has varied greatly over time.

See also
 Geodata for the Communes of Luxembourg, extracted from OpenStreetMap

Footnotes

 
Communes